Yamalmax is a class of ice navigation tankers for the transportation of LNG with maximum dimensions that allow passing through the approach channel of the port of Sabetta located on the Yamal Peninsula (channel width , depth ). The project was developed by the Finnish company Aker Arctic by order of Sovcomflot.

By design, gas carriers of the Yamalmax class are classified as double acting ships - the bow is adapted for navigation in open water and in thin ice conditions, and the stern is optimized for independent navigation in difficult ice conditions. Constant power regardless of the direction of movement is achieved by using the Azipod propellers produced by the Swedish-Swiss company ABB. Each Yamalmax ship is equipped with three rudder propellers with a total capacity of 45 MW.

See also 
 Yamal LNG

References

Industry in the Arctic
LNG tankers
Tankers
Ship measurements
Ship types